Bristol Municipal Stadium, also referred to as the Stone Castle, is an athletic facility located on the campus of Bristol Tennessee High School in Bristol, Tennessee.  The structure features a design that is reminiscent of Medieval Gothic architecture and has a seating capacity of approximately 8,000.  The stadium currently serves as the home field of the football team of Tennessee High School.  The structure was added to the National Register of Historic Places in 1987.

History

Bristol Municipal Stadium was built during the New Deal by the Works Progress Administration (WPA).  It is one of two WPA stadiums in Tennessee that are still in use, the other being Crump Stadium in Memphis.  Construction of Bristol Municipal Stadium began in 1934 and was completed in 1936.  The construction cost of $34,000  was shared between the federal government and the city of Bristol. The stadium opened on October 8, 1936.

The stadium has been the home field for football teams not only for Tennessee High School, but also for Virginia High School in Bristol, Virginia, the two cities' former segregated high schools for African-Americans (Slater High School in Bristol, Tennessee, and Douglass High School in Bristol, Virginia), King College and Emory & Henry College.

A renovation of the facility was completed in 1986 at a cost of $500,000.

Architecture
The stadium is built of rough rubble limestone obtained from a WPA project nearby.

References

External links
Photographs and history of stadium on website of Tennessee High School

Sports venues on the National Register of Historic Places in Tennessee
Sports venues in Tennessee
Bristol, Tennessee
Works Progress Administration in Tennessee
Buildings and structures in Sullivan County, Tennessee
Tourist attractions in Sullivan County, Tennessee
Tourist attractions in Bristol, Tennessee
National Register of Historic Places in Sullivan County, Tennessee
1934 establishments in Tennessee
Sports venues completed in 1934
High school football venues in the United States
American football venues in Tennessee
College football venues